Happily may refer to:
 Happily (film), an American comedy thriller
 Happily (horse), a racehorse
 "Happily" (song), by One Direction

See also 
 Happy (disambiguation)
 Happiness (disambiguation)